Union Township is one of twelve townships in Rush County, Indiana. As of the 2010 census, its population was 765 and it contained 342 housing units.

History
The Dr. John Arnold Farm was listed on the National Register of Historic Places in 1989.

Geography

Cities and towns
 Glenwood

Unincorporated towns
 Fairview at 
 Falmouth at 
 Farmington at 
 Gings at 
 Mauzy at 
(This list is based on USGS data and may include former settlements.)

References

External links
 Indiana Township Association
 United Township Association of Indiana

Townships in Rush County, Indiana
Townships in Indiana